Ahmed Nadhir Benbouali (born April 17, 2000) is an Algerian professional footballer who plays for Charleroi.

Club career
On July 23, 2022, Benbouali joined Belgian club Charleroi, signing a three year contract with the club until 2025.

References

External links
 

2000 births
Living people
Algerian footballers
Algerian Ligue Professionnelle 1 players
ASO Chlef players
Paradou AC players
People from Chlef
21st-century Algerian people
Expatriate footballers in Belgium
Algerian expatriates in Belgium
R. Charleroi S.C. players
Algeria A' international footballers
Belgian Pro League players